John David Fitzgerald (Born July 16, 1948 in Wilmette, Illinois, Chicago) is an American modern pentathlete who represented the United States at the 1972 and 1976 Summer Olympics. He also qualified for the 1980 U.S. Olympic team but was not able to compete due to the U.S. Olympic Committee's boycott of the 1980 Summer Olympics in Moscow, Russia. He was one of 461 athletes to receive a Congressional Gold Medal many years later. 

From 1962 to 1966, Fitzgerald was a star swimmer at Loyola Academy in Wilmette, Illinois.  In 1973, 1974, and 1980, he won the United States National Championship in the Pentathlon, and in 1971 and 1973 he won the National Championship in the Triathlon.

He is a member of the Chicagoland Sports Hall of Fame.

References 

1948 births
Living people
American male modern pentathletes
Modern pentathletes at the 1972 Summer Olympics
Modern pentathletes at the 1976 Summer Olympics
Olympic modern pentathletes of the United States
Congressional Gold Medal recipients
People from Wilmette, Illinois
20th-century American people
21st-century American people